The UGL Rail PH37ACmai is a model of diesel locomotives built by UGL Rail, Broadmeadow in 2014. The frames were fabricated in Townsville.

History
In November 2011 UGL Rail announced it would develop a  gauge version of the GE PowerHaul locomotive.

UGL are manufacturing three prototypes at their Broadmeadow factory. They are similar in appearance to the UGL Rail C44aci class.

In July 2016, UGL secured a contract to supply three units to Pacific National for use in Queensland. These entered service in 2018 as the PH class, numbered PH001-003. They are used on Newlands and Goonyella network coal trains.

References

Diesel-electric locomotives of Australia
Railway locomotives introduced in 2014
3 ft 6 in gauge locomotives of Australia